The 1921 West Virginia vs. Pittsburgh football game was a college football game between the West Virginia Mountaineers and the Pittsburgh Panthers played on October 8, 1921. It was the 17th meeting of the Backyard Brawl, a rivalry game between the two programs.

The game was played at Forbes Field in Pittsburgh, Pennsylvania. Pittsburgh won the game 21–13, after West Virginia's George Hill returned a kick-off for a touchdown on the final play of the game.

The game was broadcast on radio station KDKA by Westinghouse engineer Harold Arlin, and was that station's first live radio play-by-play broadcast of a college football game.

See also
 College football on radio
 1921 college football season

References

1921 college football season
vs. West Virginia 1921
vs. Pittsburgh 1921
October 1921 sports events
1921 in sports in Pennsylvania